The Nokia Xseries is a line of mobile phones from Nokia introduced in September 2009 as the successor of the XpressMusic series. It was targeted towards a young audience, and are more focused on music and entertainment with special dedicated keys, inbuilt storage and other facilities. The X2-02, released in January 2012, was the last handset of the series.

In May 2018, HMD Global launched the new Nokia X6 on the Chinese market but not officially classified it as new member of Xseries. In April 2021, the Xseries reintroduced as the highest tier smartphone series of the brand with the launch of Nokia X10 and Nokia X20.

List of devices

Series 30 mobile phones
Nokia X1-00
Nokia X1-01

Series 40 mobile phones
Nokia X2-00
Nokia X2-01
Nokia X2-02
Nokia X2-05
Nokia X3-00
Nokia X3 Touch and Type (or Nokia X3-02)

Symbian smartphones
Nokia X5-00
Nokia X5-01
Nokia X6-00
Nokia X7-00

Android smartphones
 Nokia X10
 Nokia X20
 Nokia XR20
 Nokia X30
 Nokia X60 Pro
 Nokia X200 Ultra
 Nokia X200 Pro Plus
 Nokia X400 Ultra

See also
Nokia phone series

References

Nokia XSeries